Nammina Bantu is a 1960 Indian Telugu-language drama film directed by Adurthi Subba Rao. It stars Akkineni Nageswara Rao, S. V. Ranga Rao, and Savitri, with music jointly composed by S. Rajeswara Rao and Master Venu. The film was simultaneously made in Tamil as Pattaliyin Vetri, under the same banner and director, and some of the scenes and artists are the same in both versions. Upon release Nammina Bantu received critical acclaim. The film was featured at the 8th San Sebastián International Film Festival. The film won the National Film Award for Best Feature Film in Telugu.

Plot 
 Telugu version
At the start of the film, Chandrayya (S. V. Ranga Rao), a distressed peasant, checks in a village along with his daughter Lakshmi (Savitri) and an ox. He meets a landlord Bhujangarao (Gummadi), a cruel and crafty person, to seek some land on the lease. Bhujangarao promises to give two acres of fertile land after yielding his Mango orchards, and also provides another sick ox; Chandrayya names the oxen as Ramudu and Lakshamanudu. Prasad (Akkineni Nageswara Rao), a loyal trustworthy servant of Bhujangarao, shares a bond with his master beyond that of a servant and also takes care of Bhujangarao's daughter Sarala (Girija) as his own sister. In parallel, as a glimpse, Devayya (Relangi), Bhujangarao's nephew, returns to the village and falls for Sarala. After some time, Chandrayya successfully yields the mango orchard when Bhujangarao deceits him by endowing a dry land. Chandrayya decides to dig a well when Sarala also repents for her father's breach, so she supports them with the help of Devayya. After crossing many hurdles, Chandrayya acquires the triumph but to bring out the water there is a necessity of a motor for which a huge amount is required. At that point in time, as usual, bullock cart races are conducted in which Prasad wins every year, so Lakshmi determines to participate in it with Ramalakshmanulu for the prize amount. Here Sarala pleas Prasad to lose the bet, then he replies as a trusty workhorse he cannot mortgage the prestige of his sovereign. During the time of the race, Prasad attempts the best shot but Lakshmi holds the victory. Bhujangarao accuses and humiliates Prasad as he intentionally did the deed. As a result, he leaves his service. Peeved by this, Bhujangarao intrigues to destroy the motor when Prasad obstructs and injured. Now Lakshmi realizes Prasad's honesty and they start loving each other. Thereafter, on the advice of Devayya, Prasad collaborates with the peasants and performs cooperative farming which irks Bhujangarao and ploys to thwart their plans. At last, in the final battle, Bhujangarao falls into a bog and Prasad struggles to extricate him but fails. Before dying, he entrusts Sarala's responsibility to Prasad. Finally, the movie ends on a happy note with the marriages of Prasad and Lakshmi, and Devayya and Sarala.

 Tamil version
The film begins, Paramasiva (S. V. Ranga Rao) distressed peasant checks in a village along with his daughter Lakshmi (Savitri) and an ox. He meets Sowcar Shivam (T.S.Balaiah) a cruel & crafty person to seek some land on the lease. Shivam promises to give 2 acres of fertile land after yielding his mango orchards, also provides another sick ox and Paramasiva names them as Ramudu & Lakshamanudu. Kannan (Akkineni Nageswara Rao) a loyal trustworthy servant of Shivam whose word is an ordinance to him, shares a bond beyond a servant and also takes care of Bhujangarao's daughter Chandra (Girija) as his own sister. Meanwhile, as a glimpse, Ranga (K. A. Thangavelu) Shivam's nephew return to the village giving up his education and falls for Chandra. After some time, Paramasiva successfully yields the mango orchard when Shivam deceits him by endowing a dry land. Right now, Paramasiva decides to dig a well at the site shown by Ramudu, Chandra also repents for her father's breach, so, she supports them with the help of Ranga. After crossing many hurdles Paramasiva acquires the triumph but to bring out the water there is a necessity of a motor for which a huge amount is required. At that point in time, as usual, bullock cart races are conducted in which Kannan wins every year, so, Lakshmi determines to participate in it with Ramalakshmanulu for the prize amount. Here Chandra pleas Kannan to loss the bet when he replies that ready to sacrifice his life but not the prestige of his sovereign. During the time of the race, Kannan attempts the best shot but Lakshmi holds the victory. At present, Shivam accuses & humiliates Kannan as he intentionally did the deed, as a result, he leaves his service. Peeved by this, Shivam intrigues to destroy the motor when Kannan obstructs and injured. Now Lakshmi realizes Kannan's honesty and they start loving each other. Thereafter, on the advice of Ranga, Kannan collaborates all the peasants and performs cooperative farming which irks Shivam and ploys to thwart their plans. At last, in the final battle, Shivam falls into a bog, Kannan struggles to extricate him but fails and before dying, he entrusts Chandra's responsibility to Kannan. Finally, the movie ends on a happy note with the marriage of Kannan & Lakshmi and Ranga & Chandra.

Cast 
 Telugu version
Akkineni Nageswara Rao as Prasad
Savitri as Lakshmi
S. V. Ranga Rao as Chandrayya
Gummadi as Zamindar Bhujanga Rao
Relangi as Devayya
Chadalavada as Surayya
Hemalata as Kanakamma
Girija as Sarala
E. V. Saroja as Dancer
 Lanka Satyam

 Tamil version
Akkineni Nageswara Rao as Kannan
Savitri as Lakshmi
S. V. Ranga Rao as Paramasiva
T. S. Balaiah as Sivam
K. A. Thangavelu as Ranga
K. Sarangapani
P. D. Sambandam as Singaram
Girija as Chandra
E. V. Saroja as Dancer
K. R. Chellam
K. N. Kamalam

Soundtrack 

Music composed by S. Rajeswara Rao & Master Venu. Music released on Audio Company. All the tunes for all the songs for both languages are the same.

Telugu version
Nammina Bantu
Lyrics were written by Kosaraju. Playback singers are Ghantasala, Madhavapeddi Satyam, Jikki, P. Susheela, P. Leela, T. V. Rathnam and Swarnalatha.

Tamil version
Pattaliyin Vetri
Lyrics by Udumalai Narayana Kavi and Ka. Mu. Sheriff. Playback singers are T. M. Soundararajan, Ghantasala, Seerkazhi Govindarajan, S. C. Krishnan, Jikki, P. Susheela, P. Leela, T. V. Rathnam & Swarnalatha.

Production 
Yarlagadda Venkanna Chowdary, who himself was a landlord decided to produce a film based on the theme of exploitation of farmers by landlords written by socialist writer Sunkara Sathyanarayana for his debut production. Adurthi Subbarao was signed on to direct the film, while Sunkara and Tapi Dharma Rao wrote the dialogues. B. S. Jagirdar and Akkineni Sanjeevi worked as cinematographer and editor respectively. The film was simultaneously made in Tamil as Pattaliyin Vetri.

Nageswara Rao and Savitri were selected to portray the lead pair. S. V. Rangarao was first offered the landlord's role, but Rangarao preferred the character of downtrodden farmer Chandrayya's character as he found it more challenging. Dagubati Ramanaidu, who went on to become a popular producer in Telugu cinema worked as one of the partners in the film. The film also happened to be his debut film as an actor. He acted as the body double for Nageswara Rao, driving the bullock cart in long shot scenes, besides donning the district collector's role.

Award 
National Film Awards
 1959: President's silver medal for Best Feature Film in Telugu

References

External links 

 

1960s Telugu-language films
1960s Tamil-language films
1960 films
Indian multilingual films
Films directed by Adurthi Subba Rao
Best Telugu Feature Film National Film Award winners
1960s multilingual films
Films scored by Master Venu
Films scored by S. Rajeswara Rao